KCCE (1340 AM) is an American radio station licensed to serve the community of San Angelo, Texas. The station's broadcast license is held by Houston Christian Broadcasters, Inc.

KCCE broadcasts a Christian radio format to the greater San Angelo, Texas, area.

The station was assigned the call sign "KCRN" by the U.S. Federal Communications Commission (FCC) on September 9, 1991. The station changed its call sign to KCCE on September 7, 2018.

Translators

References

External links

CCE (AM)
CCE (AM)
Radio stations established in 1947
1947 establishments in Texas